, also known as Matz, is a Japanese computer scientist and software programmer best known as the chief designer of the Ruby programming language and its original reference implementation, Matz's Ruby Interpreter (MRI). His demeanor has brought about a motto in the Ruby community: "Matz is nice and so we are nice," commonly abbreviated as MINASWAN.

, Matsumoto is the Chief Architect of Ruby at Heroku, an online cloud platform-as-a-service in San Francisco. He is a fellow of Rakuten Institute of Technology, a research and development organization in Rakuten Inc. He was appointed to the role of technical advisor for VASILY, Inc. starting in June 2014.

Early life
Born in Osaka Prefecture, Japan, he was raised in Tottori Prefecture from the age of four. According to an interview conducted by Japan Inc., he was a self-taught programmer until the end of high school. He graduated with an information science degree from University of Tsukuba, where he was a member of Ikuo Nakata's research lab on programming languages and compilers.

Work
He works for the Japanese open source company Netlab.jp. Matsumoto is known as one of the open source evangelists in Japan.  He has released several open source products, including cmail, the Emacs-based mail user agent, written entirely in Emacs Lisp. Ruby is his first piece of software that has become known outside Japan.

Ruby
Matsumoto released the first version of the Ruby programming language on 21 December 1995. He still leads the development of the language's reference implementation, MRI (for Matz's Ruby Interpreter).

MRuby
In April 2012, Matsumoto open-sourced his work on a new implementation of Ruby called mruby. It is a minimal implementation based on his virtual machine, called ritevm, and is designed to allow software developers to embed Ruby in other programs while keeping memory footprint small and performance optimised.

streem
In December 2014, Matsumoto open-sourced his work on a new scripting language called streem, a concurrent language based on a programming model similar to shell, with influences from Ruby, Erlang and other functional programming languages.

Treasure Data
Matsumoto has been listed as an investor for Treasure Data; many of the company's programs such as Fluentd use Ruby as their primary language.

Written works
 オブジェクト指向スクリプト言語 Ruby 
 Ruby in a Nutshell 
 The Ruby Programming Language

Recognition
Matsumoto received the 2011 Award for the Advancement of Free Software from the Free Software Foundation (FSF) at the 2012 LibrePlanet conference at the University of Massachusetts Boston in Boston.

Personal life
Matsumoto is married and has four children. He is a member of the Church of Jesus Christ of Latter-day Saints, did standard service as a missionary and is now a counselor in the bishopric in his church ward.

See also
 Ruby (programming language)
 Ruby MRI
 Ruby on Rails

References

External links

 Matz's web diary (and translated to English with Google Translate) 
 Ruby Design Principles talk from IT Conversations
 The Ruby Programming Language – An introduction to the language by its own author
 Treating Code as an Essay – Matz's writeup for the book Beautiful Code, edited by Andy Oram, Greg Wilson, O'Reilly, 2007.  

1965 births
Free software programmers
Japanese computer programmers
Japanese computer scientists
Japanese Latter Day Saints
Living people
People from Osaka Prefecture
People from Tottori Prefecture
Programming language designers
Rakuten
Ruby (programming language)
University of Tsukuba alumni